The 2012–13 Slovenian Second League season began on 4 August 2012 and ended on 25 May 2013. Each team played a total of 27 matches.

Clubs

League table

Results

First and second round

Third round

See also
2012–13 Slovenian PrvaLiga
2012–13 Slovenian Third League

External links
Football Association of Slovenia 

Slovenian Second League seasons
2012–13 in Slovenian football
Slovenia